Christ College Of Engineering and Technology (French: Collège Christ d'ingénierie et de technologie) is an engineering college in Pondicherry Union territory, India. The college was established in 2007 to provide technical education to young citizens. The institution is affiliated to Pondicherry University and is approved by All India Council for Technical Education. It was started by 10 March 2007.

Location and Access

The college is located in the suburban locality of Moolakulum, about four kilometers from Puducherry and 36 kilometers from Villupuram City.

Board of Management 
The college is administered by a Board Of Management of A Unit of Sam Paul Educational Trust.

 Founder:Pavalan 
Chairman & MD:  Dr. S.R.S. Paul
 Principal:Dr. A. Sivakumar

Courses

Undergraduate Course:

 B.Tech. – Computer Science&Engineering
 B.Tech. – Information Technology
 B.Tech. – Electronics & Communication Engineering
 B.Tech. – Electrical & Electronics Engineering
 B.Tech. – Mechanical Engineering            
 B.Tech. – Civil Engineering

Post-Graduate Course:      
 M.Tech. – Computer Science & Engineering            
 M.Tech. – Electronics &Communication Engineering
 M.Tech. – Wireless Communication
 M.Tech. – Electrical Drives & Control*
 M.B.A. – Master of Business Administration
 M.C.A.  – Master of Computer Application

Admission
Eligibility

Eligibility to admission to the undergraduate degree courses is a successful completion of the higher secondary course or equivalent level education for direct entry students. For lateral entry students (those entering in the second year), diploma degree in any engineering course is necessary. Students can also enter via CENTAC, in which case they would not have to pay management seats. 50% of the college seats are reserved for students who deserve CENTAC seats.

Infrastructure
The college has a campus spread in an area of 60 acres of land. It consists of a number of buildings.

Placement
The Placement Cell was established in 2009. The cell arranges campus interviews with organisations for placement of final year students, and arranges in-industry training for students. Campus placement training (HR, Technical, GD, Written Test) is given in the pre-final year for all eligible candidates.

References

:Category:All India Council for Technical Education

Universities and colleges in Pondicherry (city)
Engineering colleges in Puducherry
2007 establishments in Puducherry